The ninth season of the Case Closed anime was directed by Yasuichiro Yamamoto and produced by TMS Entertainment and Yomiuri Telecasting Corporation. The series is based on Gosho Aoyama's Case Closed manga series. In Japan, the series is titled  but was changed due to legal issues with the title Detective Conan. The episodes' plot follows Conan Edogawa's daily adventures.

The episodes use five pieces of theme music: two opening themes and three closing themes. The second opening theme is "Destiny" by Miki Matsuhashi for the rest of the season. The first ending theme is "Start in My Life" by Mai Kuraki until episode 232. The second ending theme is "Always" also by Mai Kuraki until episode 247.

The season initially ran from January 15, 2001 through October 22, 2001 on Nippon Television Network System in Japan. Episodes 220 to 254 were later collected into nine DVD compilations by Shogakukan. They were released between December 25, 2002 and August 25, 2003 in Japan.


Episode list

References
General

Specific

2001 Japanese television seasons
Season 9